La Nativitat de Durro (named in the honour of nativity of Mary) is a  church situated in the village of Durro, in the territory of Vall de Boí, a commune in the valley with the same name and in Comarca of Alta Ribagorça in the north of Province of Lleida and the autonomous communities of Catalonia in Spain.

It is part of the world heritage site of UNESCO with eight other Catalan Romanesque Churches of the Vall de Boí.

Architecture

Interior

See also 
 Catalan Romanesque Churches of the Vall de Boí
 Vall de Boí

References 

Churches in Catalonia
Romanesque architecture in Catalonia
Catalan art
Alta Ribagorça
World Heritage Sites in Catalonia
Vall de Boí